The National Oil Corporation of Kenya (NOCK), is a state corporation of Kenya founded by Act of Parliament in 1981, with a mandate of participating in all aspects of the Kenyan petroleum industry. The company was incorporated in 1981 and began operations in 1984.

Location
The Head Office of the company is located at KAWI House, South C Red Cross Road, off Popo Road, Nairobi, Kenya's capital and largest city. The coordinates of the company headquarters are: 01°19'30.0"S, 36°49'55.0"E (Latitude=-1.325000; Longitude:36.831944).

Service stations
As of August 2018, NOCK operates 155 retail stations across Kenya, up from 115 in May 2017.

Controversy
In January 2016, following a company loss of KSh270 million (about US$2.7 million) for the half year period from 1 July 2015 to 31 December 2015, the NOCK board of directors sent the then managing director, Sumayya Hassan-Athmani, on compulsory leave, pending a forensic audit of the company finances. She was re-instated "three weeks later",pending the forensic audit. However, she chose to resign effective 1 July 2016. Mwangi, a holder of Master of Business Administration degree from the University of Nairobi, was confirmed as the chief executive officer at National Oil, effective 1 August 2017.

References

External links
National Oil Corporation of Kenya
Kenya Pipeline Company, a state corporation

Companies based in Nairobi
Non-renewable resource companies established in 1981
Government-owned companies of Kenya
Kenya
Oil companies of Kenya
Kenyan companies established in 1981